The women's sprint classical at the 2011 Asian Winter Games was held on January 31, 2011 at Biathlon and Cross-Country Ski Complex, Almaty.

Schedule
All times are Almaty Time (UTC+06:00)

Results
Legend
DNS — Did not start

Qualification

Semifinals

Heat 1

Heat 2

Final

References

Results FIS

External links
Official website

Women sprint